KZO may refer to
 KZO (aircraft) - UAV
 Kyzylorda Airport - (IATA code), an airport in the Kyzylorda Region of Kazakhstan
 Koninklijke Zwanenberg-Organon, predecessor of Organon International
 , an Argentine station